The 1984–85 Soviet Championship League season was the 39th season of the Soviet Championship League, the top level of ice hockey in the Soviet Union. 12 teams participated in the league, and CSKA Moscow won the championship.

First round

Second round

Final round

Championship round

4th-8th place

Relegation

External links
Season on hockeystars.ru

1984–85 in Soviet ice hockey
Soviet League seasons
Sov